Blattisocius capsicum is a species of mites in the family Blattisociidae.

References

Mesostigmata